"Memorial" is the second episode of The Vampire Diaries's fourth season, premiering October 18, 2012 on The CW.

Plot
Newly turned vampire Elena tries to cope with the highs and lows that are now part of her life, while Stefan and Damon come to blows arguing what is best for her. Stefan and Elena want her to drink animal blood while Damon thinks she should drink human blood from the vein. After she tries animal blood, Elena vomits it back up. As there is a memorial being held for the Council, April Young, Pastor Young's daughter, arrives. Elizabeth questions Damon at the Grill on whether he killed the Council, as he has a tendency to kill enemies on the spot. Damon denies it (the viewers know this to be true, as Young had caused the explosion on purpose). Later, Elena comes to Damon and asks him the same thing, though she then admits how she has trouble digesting animal blood. Not surprised, Damon takes her into the bathroom and feeds her his blood, though he warns her not to tell Stefan, as he would be furious.

Meanwhile, while Tyler and Caroline are in his room, his mother answers the door to a new man in town named Conner, who is investigating the Council's accident. When Tyler comes down to check, he shakes Conner's hand which has a vervain-drenched gloves, and Tyler's vampire side reacts. Conner then shoots Tyler with bullets in front of his mother, showing he is a vampire hunter. Tyler manages to get away with Conner in suit. Caroline comes down to see a horrified Carol.

Caroline and Tyler go to see Stefan to get the bullets out, and he notices a strange sign on them. He takes to Bonnie, who is still upset over the events of the previous episode. Nevertheless, she lets Stefan into her house for the first time. She confirms the markings are not magical, though she does not know what they are.

Elena goes to Mystic Falls Church and meets with April (who she used to babysit). She admits her fear at giving a speech. Elena tries to comfort her, but her blood lust causes her to run to the bathroom. She vomits all the blood Damon gave her all over the bathroom floor and gets some on herself. She calls Damon and asks him to bring her another dress. She has a close run-in with Conner, though Damon arrives on time to save her as she cleans the bathroom. Damon gives her a human blood bag to help her, but even this does not work, as she can barely drink it. Damon can only guess Elena's Doppelganger side will not allow her to drink a substitute. Though this supports Damon's theory of her needing fresh blood, Elena still refuses for fear that she will kill a person by accident.

Conner kidnaps April by stabbing her and tying her up. He waits on the balcony for a vampire to step up with a gun. During the memorial, Elena tries to take her place when she does not come up, but April's blood is dripping, which Stefan, Damon, Elena, Caroline, and Tyler can hear. Stefan gets Elena before she loses it, but she clearly needs fresh blood. Matt, still feeling guilty about her death, allows her to feed off him under the guise that he is comforting her, which helps her. Tyler, to distract Conner, steps up and is shot. Panicked, everyone runs out. Carol and Caroline help Tyler while Damon and Stefan go after Conner. Elena sets off to find April.

Damon and Conner get into a struggle with Conner nearly killing Damon, but is stopped by Stefan. He drives away. Stefan hits Damon for having fed Elena his blood.

Elena finds April tied up and bloody, and is about to feed on her (which would likely kill her) until she is stopped by Caroline. She calms Elena and convinces her to compel April to forget the events, which works.

While Matt and Jeremy are at the Grill, they meet Conner, who inquires about the mark Elena left on Matt's neck. He claims his girlfriend caused (a hickey) and Jeremy compliments Conner on his tattoo. When they leave, Matt states Conner has no tattoo, with the viewer no longer seeing it; only Jeremy can see it.

Conner reads the letter Young had left April in the undestroyed oven in his house and reads his actions having been done to avoid the 'greater evil' coming to town.

Later, after Stefan briefly scolds Elena for not telling him the truth, he softens when it becomes clear that Elena is suffering emotionally. He calls everyone together to mourn all their lost loved ones. Damon, however, leaves, as he feels they have more important things to worry about. Nonetheless, Damon goes to Alaric Saltzman's grave and talks to him. Unknown to Damon, Alaric's spirit is there listening. After Damon is done ranting and leaves, Alaric says, "I miss you too, buddy."

Reception

Ratings 
When the episode aired on October 18, 2012, the episode was viewed by 2.91 million American viewers and garnered a 1.3 rating in the 18-49 demographic. The episode came in 4th in its timeslot, beating and tying NBC's 8-9pm comedies 30 Rock and Up All Night respectively.

References

External links 
 Recap from Official Website

2012 American television episodes
The Vampire Diaries (season 4) episodes